Biagio Falcieri (1628–1703) was an Italian painter of the Baroque era, although his provincial style has been described as a tired mannerism, active between Venice and Verona. Originally from the region of Trento. He studied with Pietro Liberi in Venice and returned to Verona. He painted a canvas about the Council of Trent behind the facade of the church of Sant'Anastasia, Verona. He trained Andrea Voltolino, Alessandro Marchesini, Lorenzo Comendu, and Santi Prunati.

References

1628 births
1703 deaths
17th-century Italian painters
Italian male painters
18th-century Italian painters
Italian Baroque painters
Painters from Verona
18th-century Italian male artists